Nidamanuru railway station (station code:NDM), is Railway  station in Vijayawada. It lies on the Vijayawada–Nidadavolu loop line and is administered under Vijayawada railway division of South Coast Railway Zone.

Classification 
In terms of earnings and outward passengers handled, Nidamanuru is categorized as a Non-Suburban Grade-6 (NSG-6) railway station. Based on the re–categorization of Indian Railway stations for the period of 2017–18 and 2022–23, an NSG–6 category station earns nearly  crore and handles close to  passengers.

References 

Railway stations in Krishna district
Railway stations in Vijayawada railway division